Ladyhawke is the debut studio album by New Zealand singer and songwriter Ladyhawke. It was released on 19 September 2008 by Modular Recordings. Featuring production by Pascal Gabriel, Greg Kurstin, Kid Gloves, Kish Mauve's Jim Eliot, Paul Harris and Van She's Michael Di Francesco, the album incorporates 1980s-influenced new wave and synth-pop, as well as indie rock. It was promoted by five singles: "Back of the Van", "Paris Is Burning", "Dusk Till Dawn", "My Delirium" and "Magic".

Ladyhawke received generally positive reviews from music critics, who commended Ladyhawke for her ability to reproduce the music of the 1980s. The album reached number one on the New Zealand Albums Chart and was certified platinum by the Recording Industry Association of New Zealand (RIANZ). It also charted at number 16 in Australia and the United Kingdom, receiving gold certifications in both countries. The album won six awards at the 2009 New Zealand Music Awards—the most awards won since 2004—and two at the ARIA Music Awards of 2009.

Album cover
The cover artwork is a watercolor painting by Sydney-based illustrator and painter Sarah Larnach of a loosely dressed Ladyhawke intently playing a NES on an unseen television. Also visible are three cats, a Super NES controller, a Genesis console, a microKORG synthesiser, and a NES Zapper holstered in her underwear.

Singles
The album's lead single, "Back of the Van", was originally released as a digital download in 2008. It was re-released in the UK on 19 May 2009, reaching number 93 on the UK Singles Chart. "Paris Is Burning" was released on 30 June 2008 as the second single from the album, peaking at number 40 in New Zealand, number 52 in Australia and number 61 in the UK. Following a reissue on 2 March 2009, "Paris Is Burning" reached a new peak position of number 47 on the UK Singles Chart.

"Dusk Till Dawn" was released as the third single on 15 September 2008, peaking at number 78 on the UK Singles Chart. "My Delirium" was released on 8 December 2008 as the album's fourth single. The song became Ladyhawke's best-performing single to date, charting at number eight in Australia, number nine in New Zealand, number 19 in the UK and number 36 in Denmark. "Magic" was released on 28 September 2009 as the album's fifth and final single. It became Ladyhawke's second highest-peaking single in New Zealand, reaching number 31, while failing to chart in the UK.

Critical reception

Ladyhawke received generally positive reviews from music critics. At Metacritic, which assigns a normalised rating out of 100 to reviews from mainstream publications, the album received an average score of 70, based on 17 reviews. Ben Preece of Time Off lauded the album as "a glorious ride through 80s-flavoured pop, electro-fused beats and brilliantly infectious melodies". Simon Price of The Independent noted that the album is "simultaneously very then and very now: it couldn't have been made any later than 1985, or any earlier than 2001." Dan Cairns of The Sunday Times wrote, "Each of the 13 tracks has a chorus to kill for, and Brown's voice—Kim Wilde meets PJ Harvey—features an end-of-phrase exhalation that is sex on a microphone stand." Jon O'Brien of AllMusic felt that "despite its blatant retro vibe, [the album] still manages to sound fresh thanks to its clever production and Brown's fiery and vibrant vocals." Nadine O'Regan of Spin praised the album as "a confection of synth-infused, mammoth-chorused tunes that sound surprisingly and thrillingly fresh", adding that "[t]he trick lies in Brown's blissfully irony-free attitude: Through the digital wizardry and pumping beats, you can hear an unabashedly heartfelt and occasionally vulnerable artist."

The Guardians Jude Rogers raved that "Magic" "may be the best opening track on any album this year", while describing tracks like "Dusk Till Dawn", "My Delirium" and "Another Runaway" as "monumental". Elvissia Williams of BBC Music compared the album to John Hughes' 1985 teen film The Breakfast Club and stated that "Ladyhawke's genius lays in her ability to distill the *spirit* of Brat Pack-era America—its innocence, its wide-eyed euphoria, its unshakeable faith in happy endings." Mark Beaumont of NME opined that Ladyhawke's "louche synthetic pop is brazenly Bananarama, ridiculously Rio, and wonderfully [Pete] Waterman, but the lack of posing—her sheer scruffiness—makes it the first credible '80s pop record since ABC's The Lexicon of Love." At The Observer, Peter Robinson viewed the album as "an accessible but immensely rewarding listen, and while some of this singer's influences may be middle of the road, her album isn't even on the road. It's storming across the desert on a nice red motorbike." Pitchforks Mike Orme commented that "Ladyhawke is brimming with ideas whose worst moments quantify this past and whose best build upon it." Despite dubbing Ladyhawke a "skillful craftswoman", Rolling Stones Jody Rosen concluded that "as with so much Eighties revivalism, there is a chilly emptiness to the exercise; most of the songs feel like fashion statements." Similarly, Emily Tartanella of PopMatters found the album to be "willfully, occasionally wonderfully, over-the-top. But it's all style, and no substance, and so without the style, well, there's really nothing there."

Accolades
The album earned Ladyhawke six New Zealand Music Awards in 2009 for Album of the Year, Single of the Year for "My Delirium", Best Female Solo Artist, Breakthrough Artist of the Year, Best Dance/Electronica Album and International Achievement Award (shared with Brooke Fraser), in addition to a nomination for Peoples' Choice Award. This was the most awards won at a ceremony since 2004, when rapper Scribe also won six. At the ARIA Music Awards of 2009, she won Breakthrough Artist – Album and Breakthrough Artist – Single for "My Delirium", and was nominated for Single of the Year for "My Delirium", Best Female Artist, Best Pop Release and Best Cover Art.

Commercial performance
The album debuted at number 15 in Ladyhawke's native New Zealand, reaching number one for one week the following year, on 19 October 2009. It spent 40 non-consecutive weeks on the chart and earned a platinum certification from the Recording Industry Association of New Zealand (RIANZ) on 20 December 2009, denoting shipments of over 15,000 copies. In Australia, Ladyhawke debuted and peaked at number 16 on the ARIA Albums Chart, slipping to number 28 the following week. The album spent 25 non-consecutive weeks in the top 50 and was eventually certified gold by the Australian Recording Industry Association (ARIA), selling over 35,000 copies.

Ladyhawke entered the UK Albums Chart at number 47, falling off the top 100 the following week. Following the release of "My Delirium" and the reissue of "Paris Is Burning", the album made a re-entry at number 95 on 4 January 2009, reaching a new peak position of number 16 on the chart beginning 3 May 2009. On 17 April 2009, the album was certified gold by the British Phonographic Industry (BPI) for shipments in excess of 100,000 copies.

Track listing

Personnel
Credits adapted from the liner notes of Ladyhawke.

Musicians
 Pip Brown – lead vocals, backing vocals ; electric guitar ; guitars ; bass guitar ; bass ; drums, synth ; keyboards 
 Pascal Gabriel – keyboards, drums, percussions ; guitars ; bass synth ; piano 
 Roy Kerr – programming ; drums 
 Anu Pillai – bass guitar, keyboards, programming ; drums 
 Peter Huntington – drums 
 Alex Gray – keyboards ; guitars ; percussions ; Rhodes 
 Hannah Robinson – backing vocals 
 Paul Harris – keyboards, drums 
 Jim Eliot – keyboards ; drums 
 Leo Taylor – drums 
 Michael Di Francesco – bass guitar, synth 
 Greg Kurstin – keyboards, programming

Technical
 Pascal Gabriel – production, recording engineering ; recording ; mixing 
 Tony "Miami" Hoffer – mixing 
 Jason Gossman – mix assistance 
 Kid Gloves – production, engineering 
 Antonio Feola – recording engineering 
 Tom Elmhirst – mixing 
 Dan Parry – mix assistance ; engineering assistance 
 Paul Harris – production, recording 
 Jim Eliot – production, recording 
 Michael Di Francesco – production, recording 
 Greg Kurstin – production, engineering 
 Pip Brown – executive production

Artwork
 Sarah Larnach – art direction, artwork
 Pip Brown – art direction

Charts

Weekly charts

Year-end charts

Certifications

Release history

References

2008 debut albums
Albums produced by Greg Kurstin
Albums produced by Jim Eliot
Albums produced by Pascal Gabriel
ARIA Award-winning albums
Island Records albums
Ladyhawke (musician) albums
Modular Recordings albums